Planjsko is a dispersed settlement in the Haloze Hills in the Municipality of Majšperk in northeastern Slovenia. The area is part of the traditional region of Styria. It is now included with the rest of the municipality in the Drava Statistical Region.

Geography

It lies on slopes in the forested hills of the Haloze region. Jesenica Creek flows through a valley in the settlement.

References

External links
Planjsko at Geopedia

Populated places in the Municipality of Majšperk